Adele Goldstine (December 21, 1920 – November 1964) was an American mathematician and computer programmer. She wrote the manual for the first electronic digital computer, ENIAC. Through her work programming the computer, she was also an instrumental player in converting the ENIAC from a computer that needed to be reprogrammed each time it was used to one that was able to perform a set of fifty stored instructions.

Early life and education
Goldstine was born in New York City on December 21, 1920, to Yiddish-speaking Jewish parents. Her father was a business man and his name was William Katz. Her father emigrated from Pandėlys, Lithuania (then Russian Empire) in 1902. She attended Hunter College High School, then Hunter College. After receiving her B.A., she attended the University of Michigan, where she earned a Master's in mathematics aged 22.

Personal life
At the University of Michigan, she met Herman Goldstine, who was the military liaison and administrator for the construction of the ENIAC, and they were married in 1941. After marriage, Herman had his job as a manager for project ENIAC, while Adele went to the Moore School of Electrical Engineering at the University of Pennsylvania. Together, they had two children, born in 1952 and 1959.

Work on ENIAC
As an instructor of mathematics for the women "computers" at the Moore School, Goldstine also trained some of the six women who were the original programmers of ENIAC to manually calculate ballistic trajectories (complex differential calculations). The job of computer was critical to the war effort, and women were regarded as capable of doing the work more rapidly and accurately than men. By 1943, and for the balance of World War II, essentially all computers were women as were many of their direct supervisors.

Goldstine wrote the Operators Manual for the ENIAC after the six women (Kay McNulty, Betty Jean Jennings, Betty Snyder, Marlyn Wescoff, Fran Bilas and Ruth Lichterman) trained themselves to "program" the ENIAC using its logical and electrical block diagrams. Reconfiguring the machine to solve a different problem involved physically plugging and unplugging wires on the machine; it was called "setting-up," as the modern terminology of "program" had not yet come into use.

In 1946 Goldstine sat in on programming sessions with Bartik and Dick Clippinger and was hired to help implement Clippinger's stored program modification to the ENIAC. John von Neumann was a consultant on the selection of the instruction set implemented.  This solved the problem of the programmers having to unplug and replug patch cables for every program the machine was to run; instead the program was entered on the three function tables, which had previously been used only for storage of a trajectory's drag function. ENIAC programmer Jean Bartik called Goldstine one of her three great programming partners along with Betty Holberton and Art Gehring. They worked together to program the Taub program for the ENIAC.

Post-war years
After the war, Goldstine continued her programming work with von Neumann at Los Alamos National Laboratory, where she devised problems for ENIAC to process.

Death
After having two children, in 1953 and 1960, she was diagnosed with cancer in 1962. She died two years later at the age of 43 in 1964.

See also
 Kathleen Antonelli
 Jean Bartik
 Betty Holberton
 Marlyn Meltzer
 Frances Spence
 Ruth Teitelbaum

Footnotes

References
 

 

1920 births
1964 deaths
People from New York City
Date of death missing
Place of death missing
Hunter College alumni
University of Michigan alumni
American computer programmers
20th-century American Jews
American women computer scientists
American computer scientists
20th-century American women scientists
American people of Lithuanian-Jewish descent
Jewish scientists
Jewish women scientists